This is an incomplete list of Statutory Instruments of the United Kingdom in 1967.

 Teachers (Colleges of Education) (Scotland) Regulations 1967 S.I. 1967/29
 Sheffield Order 1967 S.I. 1967/104
 Diplomatic Privileges (Citizens of the United Kingdom and Colonies) (Amendment) Order 1967 S.I. 1967/474
 Carriage by Air (Convention) Order 1967 S.I. 1967/479 C.8
 Carriage by Air Acts (Application of Provisions) Order 1967 S.I. 1967/480
 Transfer of Functions (Miscellaneous) Order 1967 S.I. 1967/486
 Commonwealth Countries and Republic of Ireland (Immunities) Orders 1967 (Nos. 815 and 1902)
 Carcinogenic Substances Regulations 1967 S.I. 1967/879
 Industrial Training (Rubber and Plastics Processing Board) Order 1967 S.I. 1967/1062
 Coal and Other Mines (Electricity) (Amendment) Regulations 1967 S.I. 1967/1083
 Teachers (Education, Training and Registration) (Scotland) Regulations 1967 S.I. 1967/1162
 Industrial and Provident Societies Regulations 1967 S.I. 1967/1310
 Aberllefeni Mine (Storage Battery Locomotives) Special Regulations 1967 S.I. 1967/1395
 Braich Goch Mine (Storage Battery Locomotives) Special Regulations 1967 S.I. 1967/1396
 Ammonium Nitrate Mixtures Exemption Order 1967 S.I. 1967/1485
 Carcinogenic Substances (Prohibition of Importation) Order 1967 S.I. 1967/1675

References

External links
Legislation.gov.uk delivered by the UK National Archive
UK SI's on legislation.gov.uk
UK Draft SI's on legislation.gov.uk

See also
List of Statutory Instruments of the United Kingdom

Lists of Statutory Instruments of the United Kingdom
Statutory Instruments